The 1878 Victorian Football Association season was the second season of the Australian rules football competition. The premiership was won by the Geelong Football Club, after it defeated  in a playoff match on 5 October. It was the club's first VFA premiership, and the first in a sequence of three consecutive premierships won from 1878 to 1880. Geelong was unbeaten during the year.

Association membership 

Additionally, several provincial teams, including premiers , competed as senior clubs affiliated with the Association.

1878 VFA premiership 

Despite Carlton having a numerically superior record, at the time, Melbourne and Carlton were considered to be by far the strongest of the metropolitan clubs, with Melbourne's position as the top club based almost entirely on head-to-head matches between the two clubs, of which Melbourne won all four. 

Among the provincial clubs,  was by far the strongest, having gone through the season undefeated with fifteen wins and one draw from sixteen matches. However, Geelong had played only three games against metropolitan clubs (wins against West Melbourne, Carlton and Hotham), while its provincial opponents were not considered as strong as the metropolitan competition: this gave rise to a dispute as to whether or not Geelong's record was strong enough to claim the premiership. 

To resolve this dispute, Melbourne and Geelong scheduled a premiership play-off match - the first in Association history - for 5 October, the week after the season was to have finished, at the MCG. Geelong won the play-off match by four goals to win the premiership.

|-
| 5 October 1878 (3:30 pm)
| align=right | 
| align=center| def. by
| style="font-weight: bold;" | 
| style="font-size: 100%"| Melbourne Cricket Ground (Crowd: 7,000–8,000)
| 
|-
|
| align=right | 1.11.4
| align=center style="font-weight: bold;" | HalfFinal
|1.75.12
| valign=top style="font-size: 85%" colspan=2 | Umpires: Graham
|-
| colspan=2 align=right valign=top style="font-size: 85%" | C. Baker
| align=center valign=top | Goals
| colspan=2 valign=top style="font-size: 85%"| Booth 3, Christie, Douglass
|-

Club senior records 
Two sets of results are given:

 Senior results: based only upon games played against VFA senior metropolitan clubs
 Total results: including senior games, and games against intercolonial, up-country and junior clubs.

The clubs are listed in the order in which they were ranked in the Australasian newspaper. The VFA had no formal process by which the clubs were ranked, so the below order should be considered indicative only, particularly since the fixturing of matches was not standardised; however, the top three placings were later acknowledged in publications including the Football Record and are considered official. The senior records include the premiership playoff match.

Notable events 
  and  each hosted intercolonial clubs during the season – in both cases, the same clubs they had visited in 1877:
 Carlton hosted the Waratah club from New South Wales, playing one match under the rugby rules prevalent in New South Wales and one match under the Victorian rules, as they had done the previous year during Carlton's visit to Sydney. The result of the rugby game on 29 June was disputed between the two clubs: both clubs claimed one goal and one touch-down, but the Carlton and Waratah umpires disagreed about whether or not Carlton's shot for goal had hit the post; consequently, Carlton claimed a 1–1 draw and Waratah claimed a 1–0 victory. In the Victorian rules game on 1 June, Carlton 2.13 defeated Waratah 1.2. Both clubs were lauded for their proficiency in their non-preferred code.
 Melbourne hosted the Victorians club from South Australia. Both matches were played under Victorian rules, which were in use in both Victoria and South Australia at the time. Melbourne won both games: on 17 August, Melbourne 1.23 d. Victorians 0.1; and, on 19 August, Melbourne 2.13 d. Victorians 0.4.
 The leading goalkickers for the season were Christie and Coulthard, who both kicked 15 goals.

External links 
 Victorian Football Association/Victorian Football League History (1877-2008)
 List of VFA/VFL Premiers (1877-2007)
 History of Australian rules football in Victoria (1853-1900)

References 

Victorian Football League seasons
Vfa Season, 1878